The 1990 North Dakota State football team represented North Dakota State University during the 1990 NCAA Division II football season, and completed the 94th season of Bison football. The Bison played their home games at Dacotah Field in Fargo, North Dakota. The 1990 team came off an 8–3–1 record from the previous season. The team was led by coach Rocky Hager. The team finished the regular season with an undefeated 10–0 record and made the NCAA Division II playoffs. The Bison defeated , 51–11, in the National Championship Game en route to the program's fifth NCAA Division II Football Championship.

Schedule

References

North Dakota State
North Dakota State Bison football seasons
NCAA Division II Football Champions
North Central Conference football champion seasons
College football undefeated seasons
North Dakota State Bison football